The Ridgefield School District is the school district which serves to operate the public primary and secondary schools from the Ridgefield area, in Clark County, Washington, United States.

The district's main office is located next to the Ridgefield High School, approximately one mile south of downtown Ridgefield.

References

External links 
Ridgefield High School - Official school website
Ridgefield Washington School District - Official school district website

School districts in Washington (state)
Education in Clark County, Washington